The Handball competition at the 2010 Central American and Caribbean Games was held in Mayagüez, Puerto Rico.

The men's tournament was scheduled to be held from 25–30 July, the women's tournament was scheduled to be held from 18–25 July at the Palacio de Recreación y Deportes, the El Mani Pavilion in El Mani; all in Mayagüez.

Medallists

Men's tournament

Pool A

Pool B

Medal round

5th–8th places

Women's tournament

Medal round

References

External links

Events at the 2010 Central American and Caribbean Games
2010 in handball
Qualification tournaments for the 2011 Pan American Games
Handball at the Central American and Caribbean Games